Máximo González and José Hernández won the title, beating top seeds Julio Peralta and Horacio Zeballos 4–6, 6–3, [10–1]

Seeds

Draw

References
 Main Draw

Torneo de Mendoza - Doubles
Torneo de Mendoza